The World Festival of Clowns in Yekaterinburg is an annual large-scale festival of the world clownery, taking place in Yekaterinburg, Russia, since 2008. The organizers of this festival are People's artist of Russia Anatoly Marchevsky and People's artist of Russia Alexander Kalmykov.

About 
The festival is globally important in its cultural and social senses and is dedicated to:

 popularization of healthy lifestyle and physical health;
 cultural tolerance: participants from all over the world take part in this event: Germany, France, Italy, Spain, the US, China, Ukraine, Peru, Belarus, the Netherlands, Russia, Hungary, Denmark, Switzerland, Brazil, Belgium, Irael, Canada, etc.
 development of circus arts in Russia and worldwide;
 distributing the idea of family timespending also within the statal social programme The Family Year in Russia;
 development of international relationships in the sphere of culture and arts;
 cultural and artistic education for nursery, primary, secondary and high school students, teenagers and adults;
 in memory of the great artist, clown, outstanding Soviet-Russian actor Yury Nikulin;
 in memory of the clown, mime, writer and the creator of a new clown character "sad clown", People's Artist of Armenian SSR - Leonid Yenghibarov.

Organising committee 
The World Festival of Clowns is organized by Honoured Artist of Russia Boris Vazhenin, People's artist of Russia Anatoly Marchevsky and People's artist of Russia Alexander Kalmykov.

Periodicity 
The World Festival of Clowns is an annual event that has been taking its place since 2008.

Gallery

References

Festivals in Russia
Yekaterinburg
Clowns